Jonas Older Wind (born 7 February 1999) is a Danish professional footballer who plays as a forward for Bundesliga club VfL Wolfsburg and the Denmark national team. He is the son of former goalkeeper Per Wind.

Career

Early career
Wind began his career in Avedøre IF in 2007 and moved to Rosenhøj Boldklub in 2010, where he was named youth player of the year in 2011. At only twelve years old, he was the youngest player ever to receive this honour.

Wind played 12 games for Denmark's U17 national team and three matches for the U18 national team. He scored eight goals in nine matches for the U19 national team. In March 2019, he had his two first matches in the U21 national team, scoring in the second against Belgium in the 90th minute.

FC Copenhagen
In July 2012, Wind was admitted to the FCK School of Excellence. He played for the club's U17, U18 and U19 teams until 2018. Here, he scored nine goals for U17 in the 2014/15 season, became top scorer in the U17 league and for FCK's U17 team in 2015–16 with 28 goals in 24 games. He was the third-highest scoring player in the U19 league in 2016–17.

Wind signed a contract for the senior team with FC Copenhagen on his nineteenth birthday on 7 February 2018, and debuted at Wanda Metropolitano against Atletico Madrid on 22 February. He scored his first senior goal in FC Copenhagen's 2–1 Superliga win against AaB on 18 April. On 26 April 2018, Wind was awarded Kjøbenhavns Boldklub's youth talent award 'Granen'.

On 4 November 2018, Wind secured a derby victory over rivals Brøndby IF when he first-timed a Robert Skov cross in goal during overtime.

Wind kicked off the 2019–20 Superliga season in fine fashion with goals in the first three games against OB, AGF, and AC Horsens.

On 6 August 2019, Wind scored a Panenka penalty kick in the exact same stadium as the original Panenka forcing the goalkeeper to his right and chipping the ball in high in the middle of the goal. This sealed the match result to a 1–1 draw between Red Star Belgrade and Copenhagen in the first leg of the third qualifying round to the 2019–20 UEFA Champions League. Through his first 42 games for FC Copenhagen in all competitions, he had scored twelve goals and provided seven assists.

On 5 August 2020, Wind scored two goals in a 3–0 win over Turkish champions İstanbul Başakşehir to secure a place in the quarter-finals of the Europa League.

Wolfsburg
On 31 January 2022, Wind signed a contract with German club VfL Wolfsburg until 2026.

International career
On 7 October 2020, Wind made his international debut in a 4–0 friendly win over the Faroe Islands. On 25 May 2021, he got called up by coach Kasper Hjulmand for the UEFA Euro 2020.

Personal life 
Wind is an Arsenal supporter.

Career statistics

Club

International 

Scores and results list Denmark's goal tally first, score column indicates score after each Wind goal.

Honours
Copenhagen
Danish Superliga: 2018–19  2021-22

Individual
Bundesliga Rookie of the Month: February 2022
Bundesliga Goal of the Month: February 2022

References

External links

Profile at the VfL Wolfsburg website

Living people
1999 births
Association football forwards
Danish men's footballers
Denmark youth international footballers
Denmark under-21 international footballers
Denmark international footballers
Avedøre IF players
F.C. Copenhagen players
VfL Wolfsburg players
Danish Superliga players
Bundesliga players
UEFA Euro 2020 players
2022 FIFA World Cup players
Danish expatriate men's footballers
Expatriate footballers in Germany
Danish expatriate sportspeople in Germany
Footballers from Copenhagen